Philipp Raimund (born 23 July 2000) is a German ski jumper and representative of the club SC 1906 Oberstdorf.

References

2000 births
Living people
German male ski jumpers
People from Göppingen
Sportspeople from Stuttgart (region)